Zarouhie Abdalian (born 1982) is an American artist of Armenian descent, known for site-specific sculptures and installations.

Biography 
Zarouhie Abdalian was born and raised in New Orleans, Louisiana; and is of Armenian descent. Abdalian obtained a Bachelor of Arts from Tulane University in 2003, and graduated with a Master of Fine Arts from the California College of the Arts in 2010.

Abdalian is particularly attentive to the ways in which historical processes are embedded in physical transformations of spaces. She is a 2012 recipient of the SECA Art Award. She was also a 2017–2018 Pollock-Krasner Foundation grantee.

Work
Abdalian's first solo exhibition in New York, at Clifton Benevento, presented a constellation of subtly altered found objects that echo the features of the gallery and of each other. 

Abdalian produces site-specific sculptural works and interventions. Prior to focusing on her site-specific work, Abdalian worked in printmaking and painting. She became more interested in working directly with the elements of space after a 2004 exhibition in a non-traditional venue. Her works respond directly to architectural and outdoor spaces, using sound, light, and other natural forces to create subtle experiences that are open to multiple interpretations.

She had a 2013 show called "Zarouhie Abdalian / MATRIX 249" at the Berkeley Art Museum, with sculptures that are sensitive to the exhibition space. The sculptures were set up to use the out-of-the-way location of the gallery and aspects of the walls and space as part of the effect of the art. In 2013 she also installed a sound sculpture, "Occasional Music", in Frank H. Ogawa Plaza in Oakland, with brass bells that occasionally ring together out of sight.

Exhibitions 
Her work has been included in the following group exhibitions:
 Whitney Biennial, New York, 2017
 Prospect.3, New Orleans, 2014–15
 "Audible Spaces," David Winton Bell Gallery, Providence, RI, 2014
 Eighth Berlin Biennale, Berlin, Germany, 2014
 "Nothing Beside Remains," Gertrude Contemporary, Melbourne, Australia, 2014
 CAFAM Biennale, Beijing, China, 2014
 "Shanghai Bienniale: Reactivation," Shanghai, China, 2012
 "When Attitudes Became Form Become Attitudes," CCA's Wattis Institute for Contemporary Art, San Francisco; and the Museum of Contemporary Art Detroit, 2012–2013
 Moscow International Biennale for Young Art, Moscow, Russia, 2012
 "Rendez-vous 12," South African National Gallery, Cape Town, South Africa, 2012
 The Istanbul Biennial, Istanbul, Turkey, 2011
She has had solo exhibitions of her work at the following venues:
 "Zarouhie Abdalian: A History," Altman Siegel, San Francisco, 2017
 "Work," LAXART, Los Angeles, 2017
 "A Betrayal," Clifton Benevento, New York, 2016
 "An Overture," Altman Siegel, San Francisco, 2014
 "Zarouhie Abdalian / MATRIX 249," Berkeley Art Museum and Pacific Film Archive, 2013

References 

21st-century American women artists
1982 births
Living people
Artists from New Orleans
American installation artists
California College of the Arts alumni
21st-century American artists
American women installation artists
Tulane University alumni
American people of Armenian descent